Riverview is a suburb of Ipswich in the City of Ipswich, Queensland, Australia.

Geography 
It is bounded to the north-east by the Brisbane River.

The Ipswich Motorway passes through the suburb from east (Redbank) to south-west (Dinmore). The Main Line railway from Brisbane to Ipswich and beyond also passes through the suburb from east (Redband) to south-west (Dinmore) to the north of the motorway. The suburb is served by Riverview railway station on Station Road.

History 
The suburb takes its name from its railway station, which in turn was named for views of the Brisbane River from the railway station. 

St. Andrew's Anglican church at 33 Brisbane Road was dedicated on 14 April 1956 by Reverend Kestell Cornish, Rector Parish of Ipswich. Its closure was approved in September 1992.

St Peter Claver College opened on 5 August 1976.

Transport
Riverview railway station provides access to regular Queensland Rail City network services to Brisbane CBD, Ipswich and Rosewood via Ipswich.

The Moggill Ferry is a vehicular ferry service across the Brisbane River from Moggill Road, Moggill in the City of Brisbane to Moggill Ferry Road at Riverview. The ferry operates on an "on demand" basis and takes 3 minutes to cross.

Education
Riverview State School is a government primary (Prep-6) school for boys and girls at 131 Old Ipswich Road. In 2018, the school had an enrolment of 289 students with 25 teachers (23 full-time equivalent) and 18 non-teaching staff (12 full-time equivalent). It includes a special education program.

St Peter Claver College is a Catholic secondary (7-12) school for boys and girls at 10 Old Ipswich Road. In 2018, the school had an enrolment of 967 students with 80 teachers (78 full-time equivalent) and 43 non-teaching staff (36 full-time equivalent).

The nearest government secondary schools are Bundamba State Secondary College in neighbouring Bundamba to the east and Redbank Plains State High School in Redbank Plains to the south.

References

External links

 

 
Suburbs of Ipswich, Queensland